= Scott Chickelday =

English football manager

Scott Chickelday is an English football manager who was last known to have been a striker coach for Orlando Pirates.

== Career ==
Chickelday started his managerial career as youth manager of English Premier League side Tottenham. In 2013, he was appointed youth manager of QPR in the English Premier League. In 2020, Chickelday was appointed manager of the English women's fourth tier club Billericay, helping them earn promotion to then English women's third tier.

In 2023, he was appointed striker coach of Orlando Pirates in South Africa.
